Oancea is a Romanian name that may refer to:

Places 
 Oancea, a commune in Galați County, Romania
 Oancea, a village in the commune Romanu, Brăila County, Romania

Rivers 
 Oancea, a tributary of the Prut in Galați County, Romania

Surname 
 Evgheni Oancea, a Moldovan footballer